Forceville-en-Vimeu is a commune in the Somme department in Hauts-de-France in northern France.

Geography

Population

Places of interest
 17th-century château
  Disused railway line 
 The ‘Forcefil’ factory, that makes thread for rugs and carpets

See also
Communes of the Somme department

References

Communes of Somme (department)